Thomas Henry Carswell (22 October 1901 – 28 June 1964) was an Australian rules footballer who played with St Kilda in the Victorian Football League (VFL).

Notes

External links 

1901 births
1964 deaths
Australian rules footballers from Melbourne
St Kilda Football Club players
People from St Kilda, Victoria